Ayanggyo Station is a station of the Daegu Subway Line 1 in Sinam-dong and Hyomok-dong, Dong District, Daegu, South Korea. It is the second deep station of the first line, located at a place crossing the Geumho River. On 2009 March 13, an elevator was established near exit 4.

References

External links 

 DTRO virtual station 

Dong District, Daegu
Daegu Metro stations
Railway stations opened in 1998